The 2011 Cape Verdean Football Championship season was the 32nd of the competition of the first-tier football in Cape Verde.  Its started on 14 May and finished on 9 July, later than last year.  The tournament was organized by the Cape Verdean Football Federation.  CS Mindelense won the 2011 title.  No teams would participate in the 2012 CAF Champions League or the 2012 CAF Confederation Cup.

Overview
Boavista was the defending team of the title.  A total of 11 clubs participated in the competition, one from each island league and one who won the last season's title.  The season had one club short due to that the Brava Island League championships were cancelled, this was the most recent cancellation of a championship from any insular regional competition which led to Group B having one match short and a club had only one bye week, 31 matches from 36 and a 1/3 goal total than last season.

The biggest win were Mindelense (6-0 against Vulcânicos) and Boavista (6-0 against Rosariense), each of them were both matches with 6-0.

Participating clubs

 Boavista FC (Cape Verde), winner of the 2010 Cape Verdean Football Championships
 Sal-Rei FC, winner of the Boa Vista Island League
 Vulcânicos FC, winner of the Fogo Island League
 Onze Unidos, winner of the Maio Island League
 Académico do Aeroporto, winner of the Sal Island League
 Benfica (Santa Cruz), winner of the Santiago Island League (North)
 Sporting Clube da Praia, runner-up of the Santiago Island League (South)
 Rosariense Clube, winner of the Santo Antão Island League (North)
 Académica do Porto Novo, winner of the Santo Antão Island League (South)
 FC Ultramarina, winner of the São Nicolau Island League
 CS Mindelense, winner of the São Vicente Island League

Information about the clubs

League standings
Group A

Group B

Results

Final Stages

Semi-finals

Finals

Statistics
Top scorer: Fufura: 5 goals (of Mindelense)
Biggest wins:
Mindelense 6-0 Vulcânicos (May 15)
Boavista FC 6-0 Rosariense (June 11)

See also
2010–11 in Cape Verdean football

References

External links

2011 Cape Verdean Football Championships at RSSSF

Cape Verdean Football Championship seasons
2010–11 in Cape Verdean football
Cape